Fang Zhichun (September 11, 1905 – July 31, 1993) was a People's Republic of China politician. He was a cousin of Fang Zhimin. He was born in Yiyang County, Jiangxi Province. He joined the Communist Party of China in 1924 and participated in the Nanchang Uprising of August 1927. In January 1928, along with his cousin and Huang Dao, he organized an uprising in Hengfeng County, Jiangxi Province. In 1937 he went to Yan'an, Shaanxi Province and in 1938 he went to the Soviet Union. After returning to China, he was arrested and imprisoned in Xinjiang by local warlord Sheng Shicai. In June 1946, he married Zhu Danhua, the widow of Mao Zedong's younger brother Mao Zemin, and became the stepfather Mao Zedong's nephew Mao Yuanxin.

1905 births
1993 deaths
People's Republic of China politicians from Jiangxi
Chinese Communist Party politicians from Jiangxi
Governors of Jiangxi
Chinese Red Army generals
Politicians from Shangrao
Generals from Jiangxi